Dapto High School is a government-funded co-educational comprehensive secondary day school, located in Dapto, a suburb of  in the Illawarra region of New South Wales, Australia.

Established in 1958, the school enrolled approximately 900 students in 2018, from Year 7 to Year 12, of whom six percent identified as Indigenous Australians and nine percent were from a language background other than English. The school is operated by the New South Wales Department of Education; the principal is Andrew FitzSimons.

History

In 1952, 32 acres of land which were to become the site of Dapto High School, were part of a farming property in the possession of the Amaral family.

Dapto High School began in 1958 at the Smith Street School in Wollongong, followed shortly thereafter at its current site with 189 students, separated into five 1st Year classes. Numbers increased up to 1536 students in 1973, and have been fairly constant at between 900 and 1000 students for a number of years. Figtree High School and Kanahooka High School have also been housed at the current site, whilst those school premises were constructed in 1969 and 1974 respectively.

Numerous building ventures and renovations/upgrades occurred at the school, starting with the “Maths Block” (1961), hall (1962/63), “Art Block” (1971), grounds (1972 - 1974), Library (1975/76), agriculture sheds, tennis/basketball courts (1977), levee bank (1984), herringbone drainage to ovals (1992), Fitness Centre and paddle tennis courts (1994), main quad upgrade (1996), “Maths Block” fire (1999), lift (2004/05), and asbestos cleanup (2007).

Higher School Certificate
On the basis of the 2007 NSW Higher School Certificate (HSC), Dapto High School was ranked number 602 out of a total of 673 schools whose students sat the HSC in New South Wales. In 2007 Dapto High School students received five total credits from 87 Year 12 students who attempted 443 exams giving a 2007 success Rate of 1.13%.  In  2006 six total credits were gained from 472 attempts and the 2006 success rate was one per cent.

School-to-work program
In 2002, Dapto was the subject of a case study for its school-to-work program, which chronicled how the school innovated a centralized reporting program via school reports, which turned around an otherwise unsuccessful program and made the program a "whole new approach" which was recommended for other schools. As a result of this program the school's careers advisor, Steve Heinecke, was awarded the title of top careers advisor in New South Wales in 2005.

Notable alumni
 Mathew Headrugby league player
 Paul McGregorrugby league player
 Corey Tutt, STEM champion, 2020 NSW Young Australian of the year, and founder of DeadlyScience
 Dean Youngrugby league player

See also

 List of government schools in New South Wales
 List of schools in Illawarra and the South East (New South Wales)
 Education in Australia

References

External links

Educational institutions established in 1958
Public high schools in New South Wales
Schools in Wollongong
1958 establishments in Australia